Lhokpu, also Lhobikha or Taba-Damey-Bikha, is one of the autochthonous languages of Bhutan spoken by the Lhop people. It is spoken in southwestern Bhutan along the border of Samtse and Chukha Districts. Van Driem (2003) leaves it unclassified as a separate branch within the Sino-Tibetan language family.

Classification
George van Driem (2001:804) notes that Lhokpu, although unclassified, may be more closely related to the Kiranti languages than to Lepcha. Gerber, et al. (2016) also notes a particularly close relationship between Lhokpu and Kiranti. Furthermore, van Driem (2001:804-805) notes that Dzongkha, the national language of Bhutan, may in fact have a Lhokpu substratum.

Grollmann & Gerber (2017) consider Lhokpu to have a particularly close relationship with Dhimal and Toto.

Name
Lhokpu is spoken by the Lhop—a Dzongkha term meaning "Southerners"—, who "represent the aboriginal [gdung] Dung population of western Bhutan.

Locations
According to the Ethnologue, Lhokpu is spoken in Damtey, Loto Kuchu, Lotu, Sanglong, Sataka, and Taba villages, located between Samtsi and Phuntsoling, in Samtse District, Bhutan.

Culture
The Lhop people are animists rather than Buddhists, burying their dead rather than cremating them as Buddhists do. Their society is matrilineal and matrilocal.

See also
Languages of Bhutan
Dhimalish comparative vocabulary list (Wiktionary)

References

Definitely endangered languages
Languages of Bhutan
Unclassified Sino-Tibetan languages